OBG was an American provider of engineering, construction, and operational services for: industrial, municipal, Federal, food and beverage, higher education, and life sciences clients. This company was entirely employee owned and private and employed over 900 employees within all of their offices. They are headquartered in Syracuse, New York and have regional offices in 24 cities throughout the United States. OBG was bought by a Danish company Ramboll in December 2018.

History
OBG, formally O'Brien & Gere, was founded in 1945 under the partnership of Earl F. O'Brien, William S. Gere, and Glenn D. Holmes. The company was established in Central New York and its headquarters remains there today.

Services
OBG offers a variety of services: Municipal, Industrial, Higher Education, and Federal.

References

Companies based in Syracuse, New York
Companies based in New York (state)